Batangas City, officially the City of Batangas, is a 1st class component city and capital of the province of Batangas, Philippines. According to the 2020 census, it has a population of 351,437 people.

Batangas City is classified as one of the fastest urbanizing cities of the Philippines, and is known as the "Industrial Port City of Calabarzon". It is home to the Batangas International Port, one of the busiest passenger and container terminals in the Philippines. It also hosts one of the largest oil refineries in the country, three natural gas power plants, and several other major industries. In addition, the city also serves as the educational, industrial and the transportation center of the province.

History

Foreign rule 

The first Spanish missionaries arrived in Batangas City in 1572 due to group migration. Finally, in 1581, Spanish authorities governing the Philippines created a pueblo in the area which included the hill (now Hilltop) where the present Provincial Capitol of Batangas stands after the formal end of the Coumintang Kingdom. The town was named "Batangan" because huge logs, locally called "batang", abounded in the place. The Spanish government appointed Don Agustin Casilao as Batangan's first gobernadorcillo. Said title of "little governor" as head of the pueblo or municipio was replaced in 1894 by "capital municipal". It is not clear who succeeded Casilao nor is it known whether there were subsequent appointments of capital municipal. Don Agustin Casilao is sometimes referred to as Agustino or Augustino in some sources. By 1870, its barangays were Balagtas, Bilogo, Bolbok, Bukal, Catandala, Konde, De La Paz, Kumintang Ibaba, Matuko, Mapagong, Paharang Kanluran, Pairang, Pinamucan, Patulo, Sampaga, San Agapito, San Isidro and Talahib.

At the coming of the Americans in the early 1900s, local civil government of Batangas was set up. It took effect on July 4, 1901, with Jose Villanueva elected as "Municipal President." His term expired in 1903.

Subsequent elections installed the following as municipal presidents: Juan Palacios, 1904–1905; Jose Arguelles, 1906; Marcelo Llana, 1907; Sisenando Ferriols, 1908–1909; Ventura Tolentino, 1910–1914; Julian Rosales, 1915; Juan Gutierrez, 1916–1919; Julian Rosales, 1920–1922; Juan Buenafe, 1923–1930; Perfecto Condez, 1931–1937; Juan Buenafe, 1938–1940.
In 1941 the title "Municipal President" was changed to "Municipal Mayor." Pedro Berberabe was elected first municipal mayor.

Batangas City was severely damaged due to the Japanese A6M Zero bombardment and on December 12, 1941, the Batangas Airport which is located in Barangay Alangilan is totally destroyed. On October 14, 1943, municipal councilor Roman L. Perez was appointed Mayor by the Japanese after the inauguration of the Second Republic of the Philippines. Liberation begun when 158th Regimental Combat Team (or 158th RCT) under the command of the US 6th Army reached Poblacion, Batangas City by March 11 during the Philippines Liberation Campaign of 1944–45. By the end of April the same that year, some elements of the 188th Glider Infantry Regiment of the 11th Airborne Division was left to clear the barangays east and mountains south of the city as the main Allied Force continued their drive towards the Quezon Province. Some of hundreds thousands local Filipino soldiers and officers of the 4th and 42nd Infantry Division of the Philippine Commonwealth Army and 4th Constabulary Regiment of the Philippine Constabulary was entering and re-invaded in Batangas City. Throughout the battle, recognized Filipino Guerrilla fighters played an important key role in the advancement of the combined American and Philippine Commonwealth troops, providing key roads and information for the Japanese location of defenses and movements. Hostilities ended as the war came closer to the end.

Independence and onwards 

After the Liberation, Pres. Manuel Roxas issued his reappointment. Mayor Perez ran and won in 1944, the first post-War elections in the country. In November 1949 he was killed by an unknown assassin. Vice Mayor Atilano Magadia succeeded then Mayor Perez. He served until 1951. Mayor Macario Chavez was elected in 1951. His four-year term ended in 1955.

People voted Pedro S. Tolentino overwhelmingly as mayor in 1956. He was reelected three times.

Cityhood 

In 1965, Republic Act 4586 was signed by President Diosdado Macapagal, converting Batangas into a city. If is successful, it will be renamed as Laurel, after former president Jose P. Laurel, a native of Tanauan. However, the voters rejected the cityhood and renaming of Batangas in a plebiscite.

On July 23, 1969, Batangas became a city successfully by the virtue of Republic Act 5495. Unlike in 1965, the city used its same name. Pedro S. Tolentino became its first city mayor.

Contemporary history 

The succeeding city mayors followed are Mayor Macario M. Mendoza, 1974–1979; Alfredo M. Borbon, 1979–1980, Conrado C. Berberabe, 1980–1986; Jose M. Atienza, 1986–1987; Mario M. Perez, 1987, Eduardo B. Dimacuha, 1988–1998, Angelito D. Dimacuha, 1998–2001 and again Eduardo B. Dimacuha, 2001–2010, Vilma A. Dimacuha, 2010–2013 and again Eduardo B. Dimacuha, 2013–2016, Beverley Rose A. Dimacuha, 2016–present.

Meanwhile, on January 19, 2008, President Gloria Macapagal Arroyo opened Phase II project of the Batangas City International Container Port (with turn-over to the Philippine Ports Authority). She also inspected a major road project in Southern Tagalog. She then inspected the P1.5-billion Southern Tagalog Arterial Road (STAR), Stage II-Phase 1 connecting Lipa (19.74 kilometers and Batangas and the South Luzon Expressway (SLEX) road widening, expansion and the STAR toll way development projects in Batangas.

Geography 
Batangas City lies in the southernmost part of Batangas, facing Batangas Bay. It is bordered by San Jose to the north, Verde Island Passage to the south, Ibaan, Taysan, and Lobo to the east, and San Pascual to the west. The Calumpang River crosses the city from northeast to southwest. The area west of Calumpang River is generally plains while the eastern area is mostly foothills and mountains.

Barangays

Batangas City is politically subdivided into 105 barangays. Pagkilatan was formerly a sitio of Matoco. Malalim was formerly the "southern portion of the barrio of Sirang Lupa, the northern portion of the barrio Mahabang Dahilig, and the eastern portion of San Isidro" "together with the sitio of Malalim"; this territory became a barrio (barangay) in 1954. In the same year, sitio Malitam, formerly part of barrio Libjo, was elevated as a barrio. San Antonio was constituted from the sitios of Ilaya, Labac, Matalisay, Pajo and Cacawan, from the barrio of San Agapito. In 1957, the barrio of Talumpok was divided into two. Sitios Romano, Poyesan, Bondeo and Latag were constituted into Talumpok Silangan, while sitios Ginto, Duhatan, Kulingkang, Piit and Cuaba were constituted into Talumpok Kanluran.

Balagtas was formerly known as Patay, Kumintang Ilaya as Sambat Ilaya, and Kumintang Ibaba as Sambat Ibaba.

Climate

Batangas City has a tropical savanna climate (Köppen climate classification system type Aw/As), straddling on a bordering tropical monsoon climate (Köppen climate classification system type Am) to the east. Humidity levels are high for most of the year.

Demographics

Economy

With the expansion of Batangas Port, the operation of different heavy industries and the construction of Phase II of the STAR Tollway project and diversion roads, Batangas City has seen a gradual shift from an agricultural economy to an industrial economy.

The northwest of the city hosts different commercial establishments while the lowland areas surrounding Batangas Bay hosts the heavy industries of the city. However, despite its gradual shift in becoming a major commercial/industrial hub for CALABARZON, it still shares rural landscapes that is still preserved in the north part of the city. The Poblacion area is the major retail and commercial center of the city. It is filled with banks, restaurants, and local businesses.

Being a major port city, Batangas has seen an increase in migrants from nearby provinces, islands, and even nation states such as China, India, Indonesia and Malaysia.

Agriculture
Agriculture remains an important source of food and income for residents of rural barangays. Residents in rural areas practice subsidence farming, with some of their harvest sold to the lowland public wet markets. Major crops include coconut, corn, vegetables, and mangoes.

Industries
Industries in Batangas City are concentrated around Batangas Port, Tabangao and Pinamucan areas, and Sorosoro Karsada. Shell, through its Philippine subsidiary, Pilipinas Shell, owns large refineries in Tabangao, and provides most of the fuel supply sold in Shell gas stations in southern Luzon and Metro Manila. JG Summit Holdings operates a petrochemical facility in Pinamucan Ibaba, with expansions to accommodate a coal power plant, which raised controversy to locals and environmentalists. Other companies also set up refineries for distribution to the province and nearby areas.

Commerce
Batangas City hosts shopping malls such as SM City Batangas, operated by SM Supermalls, and Bay City Mall and Nuciti Central, owned by local retail companies. There is a sizeable number of supermarkets in the urbanized areas, some being part of malls while others being stand-alone neighborhood markets, fiercely competing with local public markets.

The Poblacion area hosts numerous shops, restaurants, banks, pawnshops, and other establishments. Two major public markets in the city proper serves produce from the rural barangays of the city as well as nearby municipalities.

The Diversion Road, constructed to divert traffic going to Batangas Port and Bauan from the city proper, is seeing a rise in retail stores in addition to industrial space. Numerous car dealerships are being constructed along the length of the road in barangays Alangilan and Balagtas. Fast food restaurants, like McDonald's and Shakey's Pizza are also rising near the Batangas Central Terminal.

Real estate
In response to population and economic growth, local or national real estate companies are developing subdivisions to accommodate the increasing populations. Large-scale developments are present, mostly of local developers, but major developers like Ayala Land and Vista Land (through Camella) also have presence in the city.

Culture

Cuisine
The city is famous for its nilupak. The art of making the dish is indigenous to the area and has been cited as having a great potential for inclusion in the UNESCO Intangible Cultural Heritage Lists.

Festivals
Batangas City host three major religious festivals, such as the Feast of the Santo Niño at every third Sunday of January, as well as religious processions during Good Friday and the Feast of the Immaculate Conception. The Sublian Festival, held every July 23, revives the old Batangueño tradition of subli. The Batangas City Founding Day celebrations are done alongside the Sublian Festival on the same day.

Infrastructure

Transportation
Batangas City's public transportation mainly include jeepneys and tricycles. Also, the city has transportation between barangays and other cities and municipalities. The city's central transportation is the Batangas Grand Terminal, found beside the Diversion Road in Alangilan.

Roads

Batangas City serves as a terminus for major highways like the Southern Tagalog Arterial Road (STAR Tollway), Jose P. Laurel Highway (N4) and Batangas-Quezon Road (N435), and Bauan-Batangas Road (N436). In the early 2000s, a diversion road is built to provide travellers a bypass to the existing highway through the urban centers. Despite the construction of the diversion, traffic bottlenecks remained inside the city. The city government is constructing a bypass road in the east to provide better access to the fast-growing industrial areas in the south of the city.

The poblacion of the city features a road network based on a rough grid, typical of Spanish-era cities and towns. Streets in the area are mostly named from historical figures, such as Apolinario Mabini, Diego Silang, Juan B. Alegre, the Gomburza (Mariano Gomez, José Burgos, and Jacinto Zamora) and the ilustrados (José Rizal, Marcelo del Pilar, and Graciano López Jaena).

Railways
Batangas City, then a town, was served by a branch line of the Philippine National Railways until its closure.
 
As part of Rodrigo Duterte's infrastructure development program, DuterteNomics or "Build-Build-Build", a railway line from Calamba will be constructed to connect with the city. The railway line, the Calamba-Batangas Line, a part of the longer Manila-Matnog Railway, is approved by the National Economic Development Authority on September 12, 2017, and funding will be provided by the Chinese government. Start of construction of the railway, as part of the Manila-Matnog Railway, is not yet set.

Utilities
Electricity services in Batangas City is provided by Meralco for most of its barangays. Some barangays in the eastern rural area near the boundary with Taysan are served by the Batangas II Electric Cooperative  (BATELEC-II) . Power in off-grid Verde Island is provided by diesel generators and solar panels.

The water services in the urbanized areas are provided by the Batangas City Water District (BCWD). Rural areas are localized, and provided by the Rural Waterworks and Sewage Authority.

The city is also locations of two major power plants that supply power to the Luzon grid: 
Ilijan Power Plant – a natural gas power plant owned and operated by the Korea Electric Power Company (KEPCO)
San Lorenzo – Santa Rita Power Plant – a combined cycle natural gas power plant owned and operated by Firstgen

Education
Among the higher education institutions in the city is the Batangas State University, Lyceum of the Philippines University–Batangas, University of Batangas, St. Bridget College,

The Department of Education also maintains a division in Batangas City. For of the academic year of 2013–2014, there are 82 public elementary schools and 18 public high schools.  For the academic year of 2016–2017, 50 private schools offering various levels of education from pre-school to college level have legal permit to operate in the city.

Media
ABS-CBN (through regional channel, ABS-CBN Southern Tagalog) and GMA Network serve Batangas City through local channels. ABS-CBN Southern Tagalog (DZAD-TV, channel 10) have hosted its studios in Batangas City until they moved to Lipa in 2015. GMA serves Batangas City through channels 12 (D-12-ZB-TV) and GTV via channel 26 (DZDK-TV). Cable television is provided by Batangas MyCATV (formerly Batangas CATV).

Batangas City has local newspapers like the English-language Sun.Star People's Courier and the Tagalog-language Balikas. Newspapers marketed in Metro Manila, such as the major broadsheets Philippine Star, Philippine Daily Inquirer, and Manila Bulletin, and tabloids like Abante, Balita, People's Journal, Pilipino Mirror, and Pilipino Star Ngayon, are also sold in the city through local distributors.

The city is the center of the radio listening market in Batangas, and is served by local radio stations, as well as some radio stations from Lipa and other parts of the Mega Manila area. The Roman Catholic Archdiocese of Lipa, through the Radyo Bayanihan System, hosts two local radio stations: ALFM 95.9 Radyo Totoo (DWAL), a religion, news, talk, and music-oriented station, and 99.1 Spirit FM (DWAM), a religion and music-oriented station. Other radio stations include 91.9 Air1 Radio Southern Tagalog (DWCH), an adult contemporary-oriented station, 99.9 GV FM (DZGV), a contemporary hit radio station, and 104.7 Brigada News FM (DWEY), an FM news radio station. Batangas State University hosts a college radio station, 107.3 BatStateU FM (DWPB-FM). Signals from other stations in Metro Manila are not clearly received because of the local topography.

Gallery

Footnotes

References

External links 

 
 [ Philippine Standard Geographic Code]
 Philippine Census Information

 
Cities in Batangas
Populated places established in 1581
1581 establishments in the Philippines
Provincial capitals of the Philippines
Port cities and towns in the Philippines
Component cities in the Philippines